Minaki/Pistol Lake Water Aerodrome  is located  west of Minaki, Ontario, Canada.

See also

 Minaki Aerodrome

References

Registered aerodromes in Kenora District
Seaplane bases in Ontario